Miraç Kal (born 8 July 1987 in Konya, Turkey) is a Turkish former road and track cyclist.

Kal won the road race at the 2012 Turkish Cycling Championship held in Nevşehir. He qualified for participation in the men's road race and men's road time trial at the 2012 Summer Olympics.

Major results

2005
 1st  Points race, Athens Open Junior Balkan Track Championships
2009
 National Road Championships
1st  Road race
3rd Time trial
 7th Road race, Mediterranean Games
 10th Overall Tour d'Egypte
1st Stage 2
2010
 1st Stage 3 Tour of Trakya
 1st Stage 5 Tour of Victory
2011
 1st Stage 3 Tour of Cappadocia
 Challenge des phosphates
5th Challenge Ben Guerir
7th Challenge Youssoufia
2012
 1st  Road race, National Road Championships
 1st Points classification Tour of Greece
2013
 1st Mountains classification Tour de Serbie
 3rd Road race, National Road Championships
 4th Road race, Mediterranean Games
2014
 3rd Time trial, National Road Championships
2015
 2nd Overall Tour of Çanakkale
1st Mountains classification

References

External links

Turkish male cyclists
Living people
1987 births
Sportspeople from Konya
Cyclists at the 2012 Summer Olympics
Olympic cyclists of Turkey
European Games competitors for Turkey
Cyclists at the 2015 European Games
Competitors at the 2009 Mediterranean Games
Competitors at the 2013 Mediterranean Games
Mediterranean Games competitors for Turkey
21st-century Turkish people